The 1998 AFL season was the 102nd season of the Australian Football League (AFL), the highest level senior Australian rules football competition in Australia, which was known as the Victorian Football League until 1989. The season featured sixteen clubs, ran from 27 March until 26 September, and comprised a 22-game home-and-away season followed by a finals series featuring the top eight clubs.

The premiership was won by the Adelaide Football Club for the second time and second time consecutively, after it defeated  by 35 points in the 1998 AFL Grand Final.

AFL draft
See 1998 AFL Draft.

Ansett Australia Cup

 defeated  14.13 (97) to 12.11 (83) in the final.

Premiership season

Round 1

|- bgcolor="#CCCCFF"
| Home team
| Score
| Away team
| Score
| Venue
| Attendance
| Date
|- bgcolor="#FFFFFF"
| 
| 15.13 (103)
| 
| 15.11 (101)
| MCG
| 27,150
|Friday, 27 March
|- bgcolor="#FFFFFF"
| 
| 10.13 (73)
| 
| 9.9 (63)
| Princes Park
| 20,957
| Saturday, 28 March
|- bgcolor="#FFFFFF"
| 
| 18.15 (123)
| 
| 12.12 (84)
| MCG
| 47,628
| Saturday, 28 March
|- bgcolor="#FFFFFF"
| 
| 17.7 (109)
| 
| 13.13 (91)
| Waverley Park
| 34,323
| Saturday, 28 March
|- bgcolor="#FFFFFF"
| 
| 10.12 (72)
| 
| 17.16 (118)
| Gabba
| 18,788
| Saturday, 28 March
|- bgcolor="#FFFFFF"
| 
| 17.15 (117)
| 
| 20.4 (124)
| Football Park
| 31,230
| Sunday, 29 March
|- bgcolor="#FFFFFF"
| 
| 14.19 (103)
| 
| 13.11 (89)
| MCG
| 70,200
| Sunday, 29 March
|- bgcolor="#FFFFFF"
| 
| 13.6 (84)
| 
| 8.13 (61)
| Subiaco Oval
| 18,133
| Sunday, 29 March

Round 2

|- bgcolor="#CCCCFF"
| Home team
| Score
| Away team
| Score
| Venue
| Attendance
| Date
|- bgcolor="#FFFFFF"
| 
| 17.14 (116)
| 
| 8.8 (56)
| Subiaco Oval
| 35,909
| Friday, 3 April
|- bgcolor="#FFFFFF"
| 
| 14.15 (99)
| 
| 11.14 (80)
| Kardinia Park
| 26,669
| Saturday, 4 April
|- bgcolor="#FFFFFF"
| 
| 10.7 (67)
| 
| 17.10 (112)
| Waverley Park
| 18,698
| Saturday, 4 April
|- bgcolor="#FFFFFF"
| 
| 19.11 (125)
| 
| 15.10 (100)
| MCG
| 29,990
| Saturday, 4 April
|- bgcolor="#FFFFFF"
| 
| 20.15 (135)
| 
| 14.13 (97)
| SCG
| 32,111
| Saturday, 4 April
|- bgcolor="#FFFFFF"
| 
| 25.17 (167)
| 
| 11.8 (74)
| Football Park
| 40,602
| Sunday, 5 April
|- bgcolor="#FFFFFF"
| 
| 28.14 (182)
| 
| 13.15 (93)
| MCG
| 53,905
| Sunday, 5 April
|- bgcolor="#FFFFFF"
| 
| 22.8 (140)
| 
| 13.6 (84)
| Princes Park
| 27,659
| Sunday, 5 April

Round 3

|- bgcolor="#CCCCFF"
| Home team
| Score
| Away team
| Score
| Venue
| Attendance
| Date
|- bgcolor="#FFFFFF"
| 
| 15.13 (103)
| 
| 15.7 (97)
| MCG
| 39,954
| Saturday, 11 April
|- bgcolor="#FFFFFF"
| 
| 16.23 (119)
| 
| 13.7 (85)
| Princes Park
| 26,518
| Saturday, 11 April
|- bgcolor="#FFFFFF"
| 
| 10.9 (69)
| 
| 15.8 (98)
| Football Park
| 28,167
| Saturday, 11 April
|- bgcolor="#FFFFFF"
| 
| 12.10 (82)
| 
| 8.12 (60)
| Waverley Park
| 20,532
| Sunday, 12 April
|- bgcolor="#FFFFFF"
| 
| 24.16 (160)
| 
| 7.15 (57)
| SCG
| 29,614
| Sunday, 12 April
|- bgcolor="#FFFFFF"
| 
| 10.7 (67)
| 
| 14.10 (94)
| Subiaco Oval
| 34,710
| Sunday, 12 April
|- bgcolor="#FFFFFF"
| 
| 12.15 (87)
| 
| 15.10 (100)
| Gabba
| 17,161
| Monday, 13 April
|- bgcolor="#FFFFFF"
| 
| 14.14 (98)
| 
| 14.15 (99)
| MCG
| 68,177
| Monday, 13 April

Round 4

|- bgcolor="#CCCCFF"
| Home team
| Score
| Away team
| Score
| Venue
| Attendance
| Date
|- bgcolor="#FFFFFF"
| 
| 20.13 (133)
| 
| 12.16 (88)
| MCG
| 78,259
| Friday, 17 April
|- bgcolor="#FFFFFF"
| 
| 11.13 (79)
| 
| 14.10 (94)
| Kardinia Park
| 26,301
| Saturday, 18 April
|- bgcolor="#FFFFFF"
| 
| 18.13 (121)
| 
| 20.9 (129)
| Waverley Park
| 36,117
| Saturday, 18 April
|- bgcolor="#FFFFFF"
| 
| 14.15 (99)
| 
| 18.10 (118)
| WACA
| 27,059
| Saturday, 18 April
|- bgcolor="#FFFFFF"
| 
| 11.7 (73)
| 
| 8.16 (64)
| Football Park
| 41,476
| Sunday, 19 April
|- bgcolor="#FFFFFF"
| 
| 10.10 (70)
| 
| 10.12 (72)
| Princes Park
| 27,508
| Sunday, 19 April
|- bgcolor="#FFFFFF"
| 
| 11.10 (76)
| 
| 14.16 (100)
| Waverley Park
| 26,241
| Sunday, 19 April
|- bgcolor="#FFFFFF"
| 
| 21.11 (137)
| 
| 17.18 (120)
| MCG
| 22,688
| Sunday, 19 April

Round 5

|- bgcolor="#CCCCFF"
| Home team
| Score
| Away team
| Score
| Venue
| Attendance
| Date
|- bgcolor="#FFFFFF"
| 
| 12.14 (86)
| 
| 10.11 (71)
| MCG
| 34,837
| Friday, 24 April
|- bgcolor="#FFFFFF"
| 
| 15.18 (108)
| 
| 12.16 (88)
| MCG
| 81,542
| Saturday, 25 April
|- bgcolor="#FFFFFF"
| 
| 18.16 (124)
| 
| 12.11 (83)
| Waverley Park
| 22,366
| Saturday, 25 April
|- bgcolor="#FFFFFF"
| 
| 16.8 (104)
| 
| 12.15 (87)
| WACA
| 26,335
| Saturday, 25 April
|- bgcolor="#FFFFFF"
| 
| 14.18 (102)
| 
| 6.17 (53)
| MCG
| 21,726
| Sunday, 26 April
|- bgcolor="#FFFFFF"
| 
| 13.10 (88)
| 
| 9.12 (66)
| Waverley Park
| 31,955
| Sunday, 26 April
|- bgcolor="#FFFFFF"
| 
| 14.15 (99)
| 
| 12.11 (83)
| SCG
| 36,505
| Sunday, 26 April
|- bgcolor="#FFFFFF"
| 
| 12.15 (87)
| 
| 8.13 (61)
| Football Park
| 39,974
| Sunday, 26 April

Round 6

|- bgcolor="#CCCCFF"
| Home team
| Score
| Away team
| Score
| Venue
| Attendance
| Date
|- bgcolor="#FFFFFF"
| 
| 13.8 (86)
| 
| 7.9 (51)
| Gabba
| 19,219
| Friday, 1 May
|- bgcolor="#FFFFFF"
| 
| 9.13 (67)
| 
| 14.12 (96)
| Melbourne Cricket Ground
| 69,963
| Saturday, 2 May
|- bgcolor="#FFFFFF"
| 
| 13.12 (90)
| 
| 10.13 (73)
| Kardinia Park
| 23,267
| Saturday, 2 May
|- bgcolor="#FFFFFF"
| 
| 13.19 (97)
| 
| 13.11 (89)
| Princes Park
| 24,813
| Saturday, 2 May
|- bgcolor="#FFFFFF"
| 
| 13.18 (96)
| 
| 9.6 (60)
| Football Park
| 30,519
| Saturday, 2 May
|- bgcolor="#FFFFFF"
| 
| 15.16 (106)
| 
| 15.12 (102)
| Melbourne Cricket Ground
| 23,041
| Sunday, 3 May
|- bgcolor="#FFFFFF"
| 
| 8.13 (61)
| 
| 12.8 (80)
| Sydney Cricket Ground
| 25,951
| Sunday, 3 May
|- bgcolor="#FFFFFF"
| 
| 18.11 (119)
| 
| 18.13 (121)
| Subiaco Oval
| 36,406
| Sunday, 3 May

Round 7

|- bgcolor="#CCCCFF"
| Home team
| Score
| Away team
| Score
| Venue
| Attendance
| Date
|- bgcolor="#FFFFFF"
| 
| 12.7 (79)
| 
| 18.7 (115)
| Melbourne Cricket Ground
| 57,894
| Friday, 8 May
|- bgcolor="#FFFFFF"
| 
| 8.9 (57)
| 
| 15.9 (99)
| WACA
| 22,037
| Friday, 8 May
|- bgcolor="#FFFFFF"
| 
| 11.10 (76)
| 
| 25.15 (165)
| Princes Park
| 16,058
| Saturday, 9 May
|- bgcolor="#FFFFFF"
| 
| 11.16 (82)
| 
| 15.9 (99)
| Waverley Park
| 23,960
| Saturday, 9 May
|- bgcolor="#FFFFFF"
| 
| 11.4 (70)
| 
| 12.7 (79)
| Melbourne Cricket Ground
| 56,093
| Saturday, 9 May
|- bgcolor="#FFFFFF"
| 
| 11.13 (79)
| 
| 10.11 (71)
| Football Park
| 39,057
| Sunday, 10 May
|- bgcolor="#FFFFFF"
| 
| 13.13 (91)
| 
| 7.7 (49)
| Melbourne Cricket Ground
| 46,217
| Sunday, 10 May
|- bgcolor="#FFFFFF"
| 
| 16.15 (111)
| 
| 12.11 (83)
| Princes Park
| 22,058
| Sunday, 10 May

Round 8

|- bgcolor="#CCCCFF"
| Home team
| Score
| Away team
| Score
| Venue
| Attendance
| Date
|- bgcolor="#FFFFFF"
| 
| 12.12 (84)
| 
| 8.22 (70)
| Melbourne Cricket Ground
| 35,384
| Friday, 15 May
|- bgcolor="#FFFFFF"
| 
| 12.4 (76)
| 
| 6.18 (54)
| Kardinia Park
| 19,449
| Saturday, 16 May
|- bgcolor="#FFFFFF"
| 
| 15.15 (105)
| 
| 14.11 (95)
| Melbourne Cricket Ground
| 43,400
| Saturday, 16 May
|- bgcolor="#FFFFFF"
| 
| 10.12 (72)
| 
| 5.15 (45)
| Waverley Park
| 20,063
| Saturday, 16 May
|- bgcolor="#FFFFFF"
| 
| 12.20 (92)
| 
| 12.12 (84)
| Subiaco Oval
| 37,361
| Sunday, 17 May
|- bgcolor="#FFFFFF"
| 
| 14.12 (96)
| 
| 21.10 (136)
| Waverley Park
| 34,541
| Sunday, 17 May
|- bgcolor="#FFFFFF"
| 
| 17.12 (114)
| 
| 16.15 (111)
| Melbourne Cricket Ground
| 57,425
| Sunday, 17 May
|- bgcolor="#FFFFFF"
| 
| 11.13 (79)
| 
| 14.8 (92)
| Football Park
| 40,559
| Sunday, 17 May

Round 9

|- bgcolor="#CCCCFF"
| Home team
| Score
| Away team
| Score
| Venue
| Attendance
| Date
|- bgcolor="#FFFFFF"
| 
| 14.21 (105)
| 
| 13.12 (90)
| WACA
| 22,803
| Friday, 22 May
|- bgcolor="#FFFFFF"
| 
| 10.14 (74)
| 
| 17.13 (115)
| Princes Park
| 20,205
| Saturday, 23 May
|- bgcolor="#FFFFFF"
| 
| 5.14 (44)
| 
| 9.11 (65)
| Kardinia Park
| 19,848
| Saturday, 23 May
|- bgcolor="#FFFFFF"
| 
| 12.12 (84)
| 
| 18.14 (122)
| Melbourne Cricket Ground
| 49,580
| Saturday, 23 May
|- bgcolor="#FFFFFF"
| 
| 13.10 (88)
| 
| 11.9 (75)
| Waverley Park
| 36,428
| Saturday, 23 May
|- bgcolor="#FFFFFF"
| 
| 6.14 (50)
| 
| 14.14 (98)
| Gabba
| 19,509
| Saturday, 23 May
|- bgcolor="#FFFFFF"
| 
| 17.15 (117)
| 
| 11.14 (80)
| Sydney Cricket Ground
| 31,420
| Sunday, 24 May
|- bgcolor="#FFFFFF"
| 
| 11.14 (80)
| 
| 9.9 (63)
| Football Park
| 35,659
| Sunday, 24 May

Round 10

|- bgcolor="#CCCCFF"
| Home team
| Score
| Away team
| Score
| Venue
| Attendance
| Date
|- bgcolor="#FFFFFF"
| 
| 16.17 (113)
| 
| 15.10 (100)
| WACA
| 28,193
| Friday, 29 May
|- bgcolor="#FFFFFF"
| 
| 17.9 (111)
| 
| 12.15 (87)
| Princes Park
| 18,317
| Saturday, 30 May
|- bgcolor="#FFFFFF"
| 
| 13.9 (87)
| 
| 13.15 (93)
| Waverley Park
| 41,780
| Saturday, 30 May
|- bgcolor="#FFFFFF"
| 
| 13.19 (97)
| 
| 9.13 (67)
| Melbourne Cricket Ground
| 31,225
| Saturday, 30 May
|- bgcolor="#FFFFFF"
| 
| 8.5 (53)
| 
| 24.10 (154)
| Sydney Cricket Ground
| 36,180
| Saturday, 30 May
|- bgcolor="#FFFFFF"
| 
| 17.9 (111)
| 
| 8.10 (58)
| Football Park
| 40,844
| Sunday, 31 May
|- bgcolor="#FFFFFF"
| 
| 19.5 (119)
| 
| 17.10 (112)
| Victoria Park
| 23,188
| Sunday, 31 May
|- bgcolor="#FFFFFF"
| 
| 13.13 (91)
| 
| 17.12 (114)
| Melbourne Cricket Ground
| 35,595
| Sunday, 31 May

Round 11

|- bgcolor="#CCCCFF"
| Home team
| Score
| Away team
| Score
| Venue
| Attendance
| Date
|- bgcolor="#FFFFFF"
| 
| 24.16 (160)
| 
| 15.10 (100)
| Melbourne Cricket Ground
| 62,866
| Friday, 5 June
|- bgcolor="#FFFFFF"
| 
| 12.8 (80)
| 
| 9.9 (63)
| Melbourne Cricket Ground
| 41,222
| Saturday, 6 June
|- bgcolor="#FFFFFF"
| 
| 10.10 (70)
| 
| 18.9 (117)
| Waverley Park
| 31,365
| Saturday, 6 June
|- bgcolor="#FFFFFF"
| 
| 7.13 (55)
| 
| 8.9 (57)
| Football Park
| 28,284
| Saturday, 6 June
|- bgcolor="#FFFFFF"
| 
| 17.19 (121)
| 
| 7.8 (50)
| Subiaco Oval
| 17,452
| Sunday, 7 June
|- bgcolor="#FFFFFF"
| 
| 24.11 (155)
| 
| 13.10 (88)
| Princes Park
| 21,165
| Sunday, 7 June
|- bgcolor="#FFFFFF"
| 
| 19.12 (126)
| 
| 13.19 (97)
| Melbourne Cricket Ground
| 58,369
| Monday, 8 June
|- bgcolor="#FFFFFF"
| 
| 21.11 (137)
| 
| 16.14 (110)
| Waverley Park
| 71,488
| Monday, 8 June

Round 12

|- bgcolor="#CCCCFF"
| Home team
| Score
| Away team
| Score
| Venue
| Attendance
| Date
|- bgcolor="#FFFFFF"
| 
| 19.9 (123)
| 
| 17.6 (108)
| WACA
| 27,112
| Friday, 12 June
|- bgcolor="#FFFFFF"
| 
| 14.16 (100)
| 
| 11.8 (74)
| Princes Park
| 23,226
| Saturday, 13 June
|- bgcolor="#FFFFFF"
| 
| 7.4 (46)
| 
| 22.9 (141)
| Melbourne Cricket Ground
| 41,567
| Saturday, 13 June
|- bgcolor="#FFFFFF"
| 
| 15.18 (108)
| 
| 15.16 (106)
| Football Park
| 40,700
| Saturday, 13 June
|- bgcolor="#FFFFFF"
| 
| 18.15 (123)
| 
| 18.15 (123)
| Gabba
| 15,924
| Sunday, 14 June
|- bgcolor="#FFFFFF"
| 
| 11.16 (82)
| 
| 17.15 (117)
| Waverley Park
| 50,578
| Sunday, 14 June
|- bgcolor="#FFFFFF"
| 
| 19.13 (127)
| 
| 14.8 (92)
| Melbourne Cricket Ground
| 43,497
| Sunday, 14 June
|- bgcolor="#FFFFFF"
| 
| 18.14 (122)
| 
| 15.6 (96)
| Princes Park
| 16,487
| Sunday, 14 June

Round 13

|- bgcolor="#CCCCFF"
| Home team
| Score
| Away team
| Score
| Venue
| Attendance
| Date
|- bgcolor="#FFFFFF"
| 
| 11.6 (72)
| 
| 11.17 (83)
| Melbourne Cricket Ground
| 45,277
| Friday, 19 June
|- bgcolor="#FFFFFF"
| 
| 10.10 (70)
| 
| 11.13 (79)
| Melbourne Cricket Ground
| 34,630
| Saturday, 20 June
|- bgcolor="#FFFFFF"
| 
| 12.8 (80)
| 
| 15.16 (106)
| Kardinia Park
| 21,833
| Saturday, 20 June
|- bgcolor="#FFFFFF"
| 
| 17.12 (114)
| 
| 17.10 (112)
| Waverley Park
| 23,845
| Saturday, 20 June
|- bgcolor="#FFFFFF"
| 
| 11.7 (73)
| 
| 5.9 (39)
| Football Park
| 28,746
| Saturday, 20 June
|- bgcolor="#FFFFFF"
| 
| 5.12 (42)
| 
| 19.13 (127)
| Melbourne Cricket Ground
| 35,055
| Sunday, 21 June
|- bgcolor="#FFFFFF"
| 
| 16.6 (102)
| 
| 13.13 (91)
| Sydney Cricket Ground
| 28,445
| Sunday, 21 June
|- bgcolor="#FFFFFF"
| 
| 10.16 (76)
| 
| 10.8 (68)
| Subiaco Oval
| 23,899
| Sunday, 21 June

Round 14

|- bgcolor="#CCCCFF"
| Home team
| Score
| Away team
| Score
| Venue
| Attendance
| Date
|- bgcolor="#FFFFFF"
| 
| 19.13 (127)
| 
| 16.13 (109)
| Melbourne Cricket Ground
| 48,618
| Friday, 26 June
|- bgcolor="#FFFFFF"
| 
| 13.14 (92)
| 
| 11.10 (76)
| Princes Park
| 25,529
| Saturday, 27 June
|- bgcolor="#FFFFFF"
| 
| 23.7 (145)
| 
| 8.7 (55)
| Melbourne Cricket Ground
| 25,723
| Saturday, 27 June
|- bgcolor="#FFFFFF"
| 
| 12.15 (87)
| 
| 10.12 (72)
| Waverley Park
| 49,706
| Saturday, 27 June
|- bgcolor="#FFFFFF"
| 
| 13.13 (91)
| 
| 10.13 (73)
| Football Park
| 32,431
| Saturday, 27 June
|- bgcolor="#FFFFFF"
| 
| 19.21 (135)
| 
| 12.11 (83)
| Gabba
| 17,275
| Sunday, 28 June
|- bgcolor="#FFFFFF"
| 
| 12.15 (87)
| 
| 18.16 (124)
| Sydney Cricket Ground
| 30,735
| Sunday, 28 June
|- bgcolor="#FFFFFF"
| 
| 11.13 (79)
| 
| 14.12 (96)
| Subiaco Oval
| 35,238
| Sunday, 28 June

Round 15

|- bgcolor="#CCCCFF"
| Home team
| Score
| Away team
| Score
| Venue
| Attendance
| Date
|- bgcolor="#FFFFFF"
| 
| 20.12 (132)
| 
| 11.4 (70)
| Melbourne Cricket Ground
| 66,287
| Friday, 3 July
|- bgcolor="#FFFFFF"
| 
| 16.12 (108)
| 
| 12.9 (81)
| Melbourne Cricket Ground
| 37,685
| Saturday, 4 July
|- bgcolor="#FFFFFF"
| 
| 12.7 (79)
| 
| 22.13 (145)
| Waverley Park
| 36,557
| Saturday, 4 July
|- bgcolor="#FFFFFF"
| 
| 12.11 (83)
| 
| 9.11 (65)
| Princes Park
| 20,782
| Saturday, 4 July
|- bgcolor="#FFFFFF"
| 
| 6.13 (49)
| 
| 11.10 (76)
| Gabba
| 15,369
| Saturday, 4 July
|- bgcolor="#FFFFFF"
| 
| 9.14 (68)
| 
| 4.11 (35)
| Football Park
| 38,430
| Sunday, 5 July
|- bgcolor="#FFFFFF"
| 
| 10.11 (71)
| 
| 9.7 (61)
| Melbourne Cricket Ground
| 44,806
| Sunday, 5 July
|- bgcolor="#FFFFFF"
| 
| 10.9 (69)
| 
| 13.4 (82)
| Subiaco Oval
| 21,042
| Sunday, 5 July

Round 16

|- bgcolor="#CCCCFF"
| Home team
| Score
| Away team
| Score
| Venue
| Attendance
| Date
|- bgcolor="#FFFFFF"
| 
| 16.5 (101)
| 
| 16.9 (105)
| Football Park
| 42,713
| Friday, 17 July
|- bgcolor="#FFFFFF"
| 
| 10.16 (76)
| 
| 15.10 (100)
| Kardinia Park
| 26,879
| Saturday, 18 July
|- bgcolor="#FFFFFF"
| 
| 16.10 (106)
| 
| 13.5 (83)
| Melbourne Cricket Ground
| 20,365
| Saturday, 18 July
|- bgcolor="#FFFFFF"
| 
| 27.15 (177)
| 
| 13.8 (86)
| Princes Park
| 16,131
| Saturday, 18 July
|- bgcolor="#FFFFFF"
| 
| 4.14 (38)
| 
| 19.10 (124)
| Waverley Park
| 39,325
| Saturday, 18 July
|- bgcolor="#FFFFFF"
| 
| 14.10 (94)
| 
| 10.15 (75)
| Melbourne Cricket Ground
| 83,773
| Sunday, 19 July
|- bgcolor="#FFFFFF"
| 
| 18.10 (118)
| 
| 12.12 (84)
| Sydney Cricket Ground
| 29,325
| Sunday, 19 July
|- bgcolor="#FFFFFF"
| 
| 11.14 (80)
| 
| 13.16 (94)
| Subiaco Oval
| 36,463
| Sunday, 19 July

Round 17

|- bgcolor="#CCCCFF"
| Home team
| Score
| Away team
| Score
| Venue
| Attendance
| Date
|- bgcolor="#FFFFFF"
| 
| 14.14 (98)
| 
| 15.7 (97)
| Subiaco Oval
| 18,876
| Friday, 24 July
|- bgcolor="#FFFFFF"
| 
| 29.11 (185)
| 
| 15.15 (105)
| Princes Park
| 26,911
| Saturday, 25 July
|- bgcolor="#FFFFFF"
| 
| 9.11 (65)
| 
| 13.8 (86)
| Victoria Park
| 23,293
| Saturday, 25 July
|- bgcolor="#FFFFFF"
| 
| 22.20 (152)
| 
| 13.9 (87)
| Melbourne Cricket Ground
| 36,042
| Saturday, 25 July
|- bgcolor="#FFFFFF"
| 
| 18.11 (119)
| 
| 15.8 (98)
| Football Park
| 30,104
| Saturday, 25 July
|- bgcolor="#FFFFFF"
| 
| 14.5 (89)
| 
| 22.17 (149)
| Gabba
| 15,475
| Sunday, 26 July
|- bgcolor="#FFFFFF"
| 
| 10.7 (67)
| 
| 8.10 (58)
| Melbourne Cricket Ground
| 44,222
| Sunday, 26 July
|- bgcolor="#FFFFFF"
| 
| 13.9 (87)
| 
| 14.6 (90)
| Waverley Park
| 50,778
| Sunday, 26 July

Round 18

|- bgcolor="#CCCCFF"
| Home team
| Score
| Away team
| Score
| Venue
| Attendance
| Date
|- bgcolor="#FFFFFF"
| 
| 10.7 (67)
| 
| 16.14 (110)
| Melbourne Cricket Ground
| 40,832
| Friday, 31 July
|- bgcolor="#FFFFFF"
| 
| 12.15 (87)
| 
| 19.7 (121)
| Kardinia Park
| 23,137
| Saturday, 1 August
|- bgcolor="#FFFFFF"
| 
| 22.19 (151)
| 
| 8.8 (56)
| Melbourne Cricket Ground
| 16,518
| Saturday, 1 August
|- bgcolor="#FFFFFF"
| 
| 18.23 (131)
| 
| 10.16 (76)
| Manuka Oval
| 11,321
| Saturday, 1 August
|- bgcolor="#FFFFFF"
| 
| 19.23 (137)
| 
| 10.7 (67)
| Football Park
| 40,670
| Saturday, 1 August
|- bgcolor="#FFFFFF"
| 
| 12.12 (84)
| 
| 11.12 (78)
| Melbourne Cricket Ground
| 70,969
| Sunday, 2 August
|- bgcolor="#FFFFFF"
| 
| 10.10 (70)
| 
| 4.10 (34)
| Waverley Park
| 37,297
| Sunday, 2 August
|- bgcolor="#FFFFFF"
| 
| 15.9 (99)
| 
| 8.12 (60)
| Subiaco Oval
| 37,145
| Sunday, 2 August

Round 19

|- bgcolor="#CCCCFF"
| Home team
| Score
| Away team
| Score
| Venue
| Attendance
| Date
|- bgcolor="#FFFFFF"
| 
| 12.14 (86)
| 
| 15.23 (113)
| Gabba
| 14,973
| Friday, 7 August
|- bgcolor="#FFFFFF"
| 
| 16.17 (113)
| 
| 8.16 (64)
| Melbourne Cricket Ground
| 39,704
| Saturday, 8 August
|- bgcolor="#FFFFFF"
| 
| 10.9 (69)
| 
| 19.14 (128)
| Waverley Park
| 32,286
| Saturday, 8 August
|- bgcolor="#FFFFFF"
| 
| 13.18 (96)
| 
| 14.13 (97)
| Princes Park
| 17,535
| Saturday, 8 August
|- bgcolor="#FFFFFF"
| 
| 12.14 (86)
| 
| 18.11 (119)
| Subiaco Oval
| 28,444
| Saturday, 8 August
|- bgcolor="#FFFFFF"
| 
| 12.14 (86)
| 
| 9.13 (67)
| Melbourne Cricket Ground
| 57,303
| Sunday, 9 August
|- bgcolor="#FFFFFF"
| 
| 10.14 (74)
| 
| 9.14 (68)
| Sydney Cricket Ground
| 30,934
| Sunday, 9 August
|- bgcolor="#FFFFFF"
| 
| 22.12 (144)
| 
| 10.10 (70)
| Football Park
| 46,850
| Sunday, 9 August

Round 20

|- bgcolor="#CCCCFF"
| Home team
| Score
| Away team
| Score
| Venue
| Attendance
| Date
|- bgcolor="#FFFFFF"
| 
| 22.19 (151)
| 
| 7.5 (47)
| Melbourne Cricket Ground
| 19,429
| Friday, 14 August
|- bgcolor="#FFFFFF"
| 
| 16.13 (109)
| 
| 14.15 (99)
| Melbourne Cricket Ground
| 64,480
| Saturday, 15 August
|- bgcolor="#FFFFFF"
| 
| 6.8 (44)
| 
| 18.10 (118)
| Kardinia Park
| 22,384
| Saturday, 15 August
|- bgcolor="#FFFFFF"
| 
| 15.9 (99)
| 
| 15.7 (97)
| Waverley Park
| 32,577
| Saturday, 15 August
|- bgcolor="#FFFFFF"
| 
| 7.17 (59)
| 
| 13.16 (94)
| Gabba
| 14,738
| Saturday, 15 August
|- bgcolor="#FFFFFF"
| 
| 10.11 (71)
| 
| 14.10 (94)
| Football Park
| 28,660
| Sunday, 16 August
|- bgcolor="#FFFFFF"
| 
| 19.20 (134)
| 
| 15.14 (104)
| Melbourne Cricket Ground
| 42,120
| Sunday, 16 August
|- bgcolor="#FFFFFF"
| 
| 16.16 (112)
| 
| 11.7 (73)
| Subiaco Oval
| 37,920
| Sunday, 16 August

Round 21

|- bgcolor="#CCCCFF"
| Home team
| Score
| Away team
| Score
| Venue
| Attendance
| Date
|- bgcolor="#FFFFFF"
| 
| 13.12 (90)
| 
| 14.17 (101)
| Melbourne Cricket Ground
| 67,157
| Friday, 21 August
|- bgcolor="#FFFFFF"
| 
| 24.11 (155)
| 
| 11.12 (78)
| Melbourne Cricket Ground
| 27,912
| Saturday, 22 August
|- bgcolor="#FFFFFF"
| 
| 9.9 (63)
| 
| 7.13 (55)
| Waverley Park
| 26,895
| Saturday, 22 August
|- bgcolor="#FFFFFF"
| 
| 13.14 (92)
| 
| 14.21 (105)
| Football Park
| 43,297
| Saturday, 22 August
|- bgcolor="#FFFFFF"
| 
| 8.15 (63)
| 
| 17.16 (118)
| Melbourne Cricket Ground
| 60,741
| Sunday, 23 August
|- bgcolor="#FFFFFF"
| 
| 11.18 (84)
| 
| 8.15 (63)
| Waverley Park
| 28,833
| Sunday, 23 August
|- bgcolor="#FFFFFF"
| 
| 10.11 (71)
| 
| 19.10 (124)
| Subiaco Oval
| 20,412
| Sunday, 23 August
|- bgcolor="#FFFFFF"
| 
| 17.12 (114)
| 
| 12.11 (83)
| Melbourne Cricket Ground
| 52,614
| Monday, 24 August

Round 22

|- bgcolor="#CCCCFF"
| Home team
| Score
| Away team
| Score
| Venue
| Attendance
| Date
|- bgcolor="#FFFFFF"
| 
| 17.11 (113)
| 
| 16.12 (108)
| Melbourne Cricket Ground
| 68,050
| Friday, 28 August
|- bgcolor="#FFFFFF"
| 
| 19.13 (127)
| 
| 18.9 (117)
| Melbourne Cricket Ground
| 61,089
| Saturday, 29 August
|- bgcolor="#FFFFFF"
| 
| 22.17 (149)
| 
| 9.6 (60)
| Waverley Park
| 39,735
| Saturday, 29 August
|- bgcolor="#FFFFFF"
| 
| 12.9 (81)
| 
| 15.16 (106)
| Subiaco Oval
| 37,388
| Saturday, 29 August
|- bgcolor="#FFFFFF"
| 
| 12.20 (92)
| 
| 13.13 (91)
| Gabba
| 14,993
| Saturday, 29 August
|- bgcolor="#FFFFFF"
| 
| 19.19 (133)
| 
| 8.9 (57)
| Melbourne Cricket Ground
| 76,387
| Sunday, 30 August
|- bgcolor="#FFFFFF"
| 
| 18.11 (119)
| 
| 16.11 (107)
| Sydney Cricket Ground
| 35,814
| Sunday, 30 August
|- bgcolor="#FFFFFF"
| 
| 12.12 (84)
| 
| 21.12 (138)
| Football Park
| 34,518
| Sunday, 30 August

Ladder
All teams played 22 games during the home and away season, for a total of 176. An additional 9 games were played during the finals series.

Ladder progression

Finals series

Qualifying finals

|- bgcolor="#CCCCFF"
| Home team
| Score
| Away team
| Score
| Venue
| Attendance
| Date
|- bgcolor="#FFFFFF"
| 
| 11.16 (82)
| 
| 8.12 (60)
| MCG
| 71,154
| Friday, 4 September
|- bgcolor="#FFFFFF"
| 
| 17.13 (115)
| 
| 9.13 (67)
| MCG
| 60,817
| Saturday, 5 September
|- bgcolor="#FFFFFF"
| 
| 12.17 (89)
| 
| 13.9 (87)
| SCG
| 36,076
| Saturday, 5 September
|- bgcolor="#FFFFFF"
| 
| 18.13 (121)
| 
| 7.9 (51)
| MCG
| 43,025
| Sunday, 6 September

Semi finals

|- bgcolor="#CCCCFF"
| Home team
| Score
| Away team
| Score
| Venue
| Attendance
| Date
|- bgcolor="#FFFFFF"
| 
| 15.17 (107)
| 
| 7.14 (56)
| MCG
| 88,456
| Saturday, 12 September
|- bgcolor="#FFFFFF"
| 
| 10.7 (67)
| 
| 14.10 (94)
| SCG
| 37,498
| Saturday, 12 September

Preliminary finals

|- bgcolor="#CCCCFF"
| Home team
| Score
| Away team
| Score
| Venue
| Attendance
| Date
|- bgcolor="#FFFFFF"
| 
| 17.12 (114)
| 
| 12.12 (84)
| MCG
| 73,719
| Friday, 18 September
|- bgcolor="#FFFFFF"
| 
| 13.15 (93)
| 
| 24.17 (161)
| MCG
| 67,557
| Saturday, 19 September

Grand final

|- bgcolor="#CCCCFF"
| Home team
| Score
| Away team
| Score
| Venue
| Attendance
| Date
|- bgcolor="#FFFFFF"
| 
| 15.15 (105)
| 
| 8.22 (70)
| MCG
| 94,431
| Saturday, 26 September

Attendance

Awards
The Brownlow Medal was awarded to Robert Harvey of 
The Leigh Matthews Trophy was awarded to Wayne Carey of 
The Coleman Medal was awarded to Tony Lockett of 
The Norm Smith Medal was awarded to Andrew McLeod of 
The AFL Rising Star award was awarded to Byron Pickett of 
The Wooden Spoon was "awarded" to

Notes
 became the first club since the introduction of the final five in 1972 to win the premiership from outside the top four, despite losing their first final heavily against . The finals system was later reviewed and altered in AFL season 2000, requiring all teams that finish outside the top four needing to win four finals matches to win the premiership.  finished fifth at the end of this home-and-away season: the next side to win the premiership from outside the top four (with the revised system) was the Western Bulldogs in season 2016, who finished seventh.

References

 1998 Season – AFL Tables

 
AFL season
Australian Football League seasons